Abdellah Ardjoune (born 21 February 2001) is an Algerian swimmer.

He represented Algeria at the 2018 Summer Youth Olympics held in Buenos Aires, Argentina and at the 2018 African Swimming Championships held in Algiers, Algeria.

He competed in swimming at the 2019 African Games held in Rabat, Morocco. He won the gold medal in the 100 metre backstroke event. He also set a new Games record in this event with a time of 55.02. He won the silver medals in both the 50 metre backstroke and 200 metre backstroke events. He also won the bronze medal in the 4×100m medley relay event.

He represented Algeria at the 2022 Mediterranean Games held in Oran, Algeria. He competed in the 50 metre backstroke, 100 metre backstroke and 200 metre backstroke events. He also competed in the men's 4 × 100 metre medley relay.

References 

2001 births
Living people
Place of birth missing (living people)
Algerian male swimmers
Male backstroke swimmers
Swimmers at the 2018 Summer Youth Olympics
African Games medalists in swimming
African Games gold medalists for Algeria
African Games silver medalists for Algeria
African Games bronze medalists for Algeria
Swimmers at the 2019 African Games
Mediterranean Games competitors for Algeria
Swimmers at the 2022 Mediterranean Games
21st-century Algerian people